David G. Potter (April 3, 1947 – June 13, 2001) was a computer technician at California State University, Sacramento who was widely known for acerbic, scathingly humorous and knowledgeable postings to Usenet science fiction newsgroups. He assumed the name of Gharlane of Eddore, a character from the Lensman series, as a Usenet pseudonym for Usenet postings and carefully guarded his true identity for many years before his death. He is best known for authoring the Lensman FAQ and voluminous Usenet postings. He died on June 13, 2001 following a heart attack.

Reputation 

The Register said "no one will doubt that he was not backward in coming forward, the fact remains that he was a witty, well-read, traveled and caring man. In short, a good human being." David Langford wrote in Ansible that he was a "knowledgeable and opinionated... fan who posted copiously on Usenet as Gharlane of Eddore."

He posted as Gharlane from gharlane@nextnet.csus.edu and gharlane@ccshp1.ccs.csus.edu. Up until 1992 he often posted as "potter@csusac.ecs.csus.edu (Carl Kolchak)". Gharlane made his first appearance Sep 25 1992 in a posting to rec.arts.sf.written about the movie Sneakers.  On May 7, 1993, he announced his Lensman FAQ in rec.arts.sf.written.

His pseudonyms in print publications included E. K. Grant and Gordon F. Shumway (the real name of the character A.L.F.).

Fantasy author Tom Holt has dedicated two books to him.  Alexander at the World's End (1999) is dedicated to "Gharlane My Imaginary Friend."  Falling Sideways (2002) is dedicated "In memory of David Grant Potter (1947-2001) --And thanks for all the fish."

In 2001, after Gharlane's death, Holt wrote: "A request for information usually produced an immediate and definitive answer. As for his opinions, he fired them like cannon-shells; they were incendiary, capable of piercing the toughest armor, and they scattered their shrapnel right across the group, often starting flames that would flicker on for weeks after the original salvo. A point-blank broadside from the Eddorian was devastating. Return fire seemed to glance harmlessly off him, or else it overshot the mark and sailed harmlessly into the distance. [...] he lives on in the minds he opened, the people who came to fight and stayed to debate, listen and learn. Correspondences that started with anger and outrage from some victim of Eddorian grapeshot mellowed into long, fruitful correspondence. Hundreds of people swapped mails with him, part of a network of friendship that reached right across the world. The centre of that network is silent now, we can no longer draw from it the information, wisdom and joy we've become accustomed to. But Gharlane survives in each member of that network as a perspective, a way of seeing things, an ability to notice things of value that previously were overlooked or not recognised for what they are. We are no longer one, but at least we're many."

Personal life 
Potter earned a B.A. in English Literature and Mathematics from Immaculate Heart College of Los Angeles; and another in Linguistics from the State University of New York at Buffalo, New York; and a degree in Electrical and Electronic Engineering from California State University, Sacramento. Potter continued to take graduate courses until his death.

Potter was employed by CSU Sacramento as a computer technician for many years prior to his death. Upon his death he was reportedly still driving the 1966 Volkswagen he got for his high school graduation.

Bibliography 
"The Man Who Hated Cadillacs" (as by E.K. Grant) in 
"The Swords and the Stones" in 
"Phantom Helicopters and UFOs" (as by Gordon F. Shumway) in INFO Journal, issue 58, p. 20.

Notable Usenet postings 
 First posting as potter@csusac: “HOGAN/Inherit The Stars”. May 23, 1990.
 First posting as Carl Kolchak: “Bradbury/Dark Star”. Nov 22 1990.
 First posting as Gharlane of Eddore: “Sneakers: Moral Confusion? (SPOILERS).”  Sep 25 1992.
 Lensman FAQ: Gharlane of Eddore post - May 7 1993
 On the correct spelling of Gray Lensman (see footnote). Mar 23 1996.

References

External links 
Gharlane of Eddore. "Lensman FAQ"
Eulogies of Gharlane from the rec.arts.sf.tv Usenet newsgroup

1947 births
2001 deaths
American science fiction writers
California State University, Sacramento alumni
Usenet people
American male novelists
20th-century American novelists
20th-century American male writers
University at Buffalo alumni